(Irish for "Irish ship") is the designation given to ships in the Irish Naval Service's fleet. In this context it is abbreviated to LÉ, as in LÉ Eithne or LÉ Deirdre.

It has been used since December 1946 when the Irish Naval Service was established with purchase of three corvettes from the Royal Navy.

Further reading

 
 

1946 in Ireland
Irish Naval Service
Ship prefixes